The Victorian Civil and Administrative Tribunal (VCAT) was formed by the Victorian Civil and Administrative Tribunal Act 1998 in the state of Victoria, Australia. As part of the Victorian Justice system the Tribunal sits 'below' the Magistrates Court in the court hierarchy. However the Tribunal itself is not a court, not possessing any jurisdiction or powers beyond those conferred by statute. VCAT was primarily a forum for litigants-in-person and the participation of lawyers or other legal representatives is not encouraged in some List areas, substantially reducing the cost of litigation. However some of the List areas will by necessity require parties to have some form of representation.

VCAT (pronounced ‘vee-cat’) resolves about 90,000 disputes per year and provides Victorians with a low-cost, accessible and independent dispute resolution service, which is deliberately informal and encourages self-representation. Its orders are enforceable by law once they have been registered with the Magistrates Court. The Tribunal  began operating on 1 July 1998, amalgamating 15 smaller boards and tribunals, creating a 'one-stop-shop' for handling a broad range of disputes. When looking at the sheer number of cases, the VCAT deals with the overwhelming majority of legal proceedings in this State.

The President of VCAT (currently  Michelle Quigley), is a Supreme Court Judge, and County Court Judges serve as Vice-Presidents. Applications are heard and determined by Deputy presidents (appointed full-time), as well as Senior Members and ordinary Members, who may be appointed on a full-time, part-time or on a sessional basis. Members have a broad range of specialist skills and qualifications, enabling VCAT to hear and determine cases of considerable complexity and varying subject matter. The VCAT has jurisdiction to hear and determine disputes under over 200 enabling provisions.

Divisions of the Tribunal

VCAT has four divisions: Civil, Administrative, Residential Tenancies and Human Rights. Within these divisions, the various types of matters are allocated to what are referred to as 'Lists'. (For example, Residential Tenancy matters are heard in the Residential Tenancies List.)
The Civil Division has a Civil Claims List, Owners Corporations List and Building & Property List.
The Administrative Division has a Planning & Environment List, Legal Practice List and Review & Regulation List. 
The Residential Tenancies Division has a Residential Tenancies List.
The Human Rights Division has a Human Rights List and Guardianship List.

The Civil Division hears and determines a range of civil disputes relating to:
 consumer matters
 domestic building works
 owners corporation matters
 retail tenancies
 sale and ownership of property
 use or flow of water between properties.

The Administrative Division deals with applications from people seeking a review of government and other bodies' decisions that affect them. These include decisions relating to:
 Transport Accident Commission decisions
 state taxation
 legal services
 business licences and professional registrations
 Freedom of Information applications
 WorkSafe assessments
 disciplinary proceedings for a range of professions and industries.

The Residential Tenancies Division deals with matters involving:
 residential tenants and landlords
 rooming house owners and residents
 the Director of Housing and public housing tenants
 caravan park owners and residents.

The Human Rights Division deals with matters relating to:
 guardianship and administration
 equal opportunity
 racial and religious vilification
 health and privacy information
 the Disability Act 2006 (Vic)
 decisions made by the Mental Health Tribunal.
The Planning and Environment Division deals with matters relating to a reviews of decisions of councils and other authorities.

Procedure

VCAT reports to the Attorney General's office each year and these reports are publicly available. According to the 2013–2014 VCAT Annual Report, of the almost 89,000 applications lodged in 2013–14, about 69 per cent were residential tenancy matters (61,126 applications received), with 12 per cent relating to guardianship matters (10,865 applications received) and nine per cent involving civil claims (7,794 applications received). Planning matters comprised about three per cent of matters taken to VCAT in 2013–14.

Applicants can apply online using VCAT's website, or over the counter at 55 King Street, Melbourne. Application fees are payable in relation to most matters that are brought to VCAT. Hearing fees are also payable on the day of the hearing in some circumstance.

To resolve disputes without the need for a full hearing, VCAT conducts compulsory conferences, mediations, and a short mediations and hearings program (SMAH). This program involves short mediations, followed by an immediate hearing if the mediation is unsuccessful.

VCAT's main hearing venue is 55 King Street, Melbourne. Its Human Rights Division is based at William Cooper Justice Centre, 223 William St, Melbourne. VCAT also sits in many metropolitan and regional Victorian locations including Bendigo, Ballarat, Geelong, Mildura, Wangaratta and Warrnambool. Guardianship hearings are frequently conducted beside hospital beds or in residential care facilities to avoid the need to transport ill or elderly people to hearing rooms.

VCAT is required to make its decisions in accordance with the law, and can only make a decision based on the specific matter before it. For example, if the application to VCAT is to dispute whether a land use needs to provide a certain number of car parks, then VCAT cannot make a decision about other matters such as whether the land should be used in the proposed manner (it can only consider the car parking issue).

In planning matters, VCAT must make its decisions based on the law and the requirements of the individual council's planning scheme, balancing competing objectives such as neighbourhood character or urban consolidation. The content of a council's planning scheme is determined by the individual council, with the approval of the Minister for Planning. VCAT has no say in what goes into a planning scheme and is not involved with the making of planning laws. It is, however, required to apply them.

VCAT decisions can be appealed to the Supreme Court on questions of law. For example, if a party believes there has been an absence of procedural fairness or natural justice, or a failure to comply with the law such as a council planning scheme, then the party can make application to the Supreme Court to have the decision of the Tribunal overturned.

References

External links
 

Victoria (Australia) courts and tribunals
1998 establishments in Australia
Australian tribunals
Courts and tribunals established in 1998